Ujeli: A child bride in Nepal is a social tragic drama depicting child marriage culture in Nepal. This film underlines the sharp distinctions between the roles of boys and girls in Nepal such as education, food and medical care.

The film is directed by Deependra Gauchan and produced by UNICEF.

Plot 
This film shows the life of a 10-year-old girl named Ujeli (उजेली), who is forced into an arranged marriage. After the marriage, the husband is allowed to attend school while Ujeli is forced to work at home in spite of her strong desire to study in school. As the story develops,  because she is also too young to bear a child.

Cast 
 Brinda Adhikari
 Prashant Khadka

Award 
Nominated for NHK award in 1993.

External links 
Video in youtube by UNICEF

References 

Nepalese drama films